Osborne Wells House is a historic home located at Newberry, Newberry County, South Carolina.  It was built about 1860, and is a brick and stucco residence consisting of a piano nobile over a raised basement.  It features a projecting raised porch supported by four stuccoed brick piers.  It was built by Osborne Wells, a prominent 19th century Newberry builder, planter, and brick manufacturer.

It was listed on the National Register of Historic Places in 1980.

References

Houses on the National Register of Historic Places in South Carolina
Houses completed in 1860
Houses in Newberry County, South Carolina
National Register of Historic Places in Newberry County, South Carolina
Newberry, South Carolina